Circle of Life: An Environmental Fable was a 70 mm documentary, shown in the Harvest Theater in The Land pavilion at Epcot in Walt Disney World, Orlando, Florida. It opened on January 21, 1995, replacing Symbiosis. The main narrator of the story was Simba.

Plot 
In the film, Timon and Pumbaa are chopping down trees and clogging up rivers to build the Hakuna Matata Lakeside Village. Simba comes to them and explains how their actions are harmful to nature. This lesson was explained with live-action footage, some left over from Symbiosis (with clips of people such as Native Americans, Native Hawaiians and Masai, clips of New York City and other locations such as the Amazon Rainforest, Serengeti, Andes, Las Vegas, Geno's Steaks in Philadelphia, and images of animals such as monkeys, bald eagles, snakes, elephants and wildebeest).

The film opens with Mufasa's voice explaining that everyone is connected in the great circle of life. A montage of animals and a few clips from Symbiosis open to the song, Circle of Life.

The focus of the main story is on Simba. He decided to show Timon and Pumbaa how another creature (man) is similarly forgetting how everyone is connected. He explained to them that, at first, they were small in numbers, so they only took what they needed to survive, which at that time wasn't much. However, as the human population grew, necessities for living space, power, and food increased.

Timon and Pumbaa are initially excited by man's developments, but Simba shows them the price that comes with the human necessities. He explains that humans have caused harm to the environment with their excessive consumption through activity such as deforestation, endangerment of species and pollution. He says that once humans realized what they were destroying, they began to repair the damage through recycling, alternative energy and conservation programs. He explains that humans helped other creatures in nature by studying them to learn their needs.

Timon and Pumbaa decide to help the humans give back to nature, but Simba shows them that they already can at home. Timon and Pumbaa unclog the rivers, thus giving the water back to the other creatures on the Savannah. Simba ends the story with his mighty roar and the film closes with a shorter montage set to the end of the title song.

Production
Walt Disney World News Today (WDWNT) explained that the "incredibly boring Symbiosis film would be replaced in 1995 with Circle of Life: An Environmental Fable." Some scenes were recycled from Symbiosis into the new film. Animated sequences and a character-driven narrative made up the film, which was inspired by Lion King.  The article added that the "1990s were a decade in which conservation became a hot-button topic, and Circle of Life was there to keep Epcot’s finger on the pulse, so much so that the film holds up quite well and covers environmental issues still facing us 17 years later."

In addition to the live-action footage, the film featured about two-and-a-half minutes of new animation, featuring the characters from Lion King and produced by Walt Disney Feature Animation.

The attraction permanently closed on February 3, 2018.

Cast
 Simba (voiced by Cam Clarke)
 Mufasa (voiced by James Earl Jones)
 Timon (voiced by Nathan Lane)
 Pumbaa (voiced by Ernie Sabella)
 Circle of Life Singer (voiced by Carmen Twillie)

See also
Epcot attraction and entertainment history

References

External links

1995 films
1995 animated films
Amusement rides introduced in 1995
The Lion King in amusement parks
Epcot
Films with live action and animation
Environmental films
Animated films about lions
Films about meerkats
Walt Disney Parks and Resorts films
Future World (Epcot)
1995 establishments in Florida
2018 disestablishments in Florida
1990s American films